"Do You Feel My Love" is a song by British reggae musician Eddy Grant from his album Can't Get Enough. It peaked at number 8 on the UK Singles Chart.

Charts

References

Eddy Grant songs
1980 singles
Parlophone singles
1980 songs
Songs written by Eddy Grant